Malory Towers is a British-Canadian children's television series, based on the eponymous book series by Enid Blyton.

The first series were released early on BBC iPlayer on 23 March 2020, and later premiered on CBBC on 6 April 2020 in the United Kingdom. In Canada, the show premiered on Family Channel with a two-part event on 1 July 2020. In America, it premiered on BYUtv on 13 September 2020. The third season premiered on 4 July 2022 on CBBC.

Internationally, the series is broadcast on CBC Gem in Canada, ABC Me in Australia, ZDF and KiKA in Germany, e-Junior, Yle TV2 in Finland, SVT Barn in Sweden, NRK Super in Norway, HBO Max in Scandinavia and HOT in Israel.

In 2022 a fourth series entered production.

Premise
Set in post-World War II Britain, the show follows the adventures of 12-year-old Darrell Rivers as she leaves home to attend an all-girls' boarding school and "explores a nostalgic world of midnight feasts, lacrosse, pranks, a mystery ghost and lasting friendships." The TV series updates Blyton's post-war period piece for a modern audience with a racially diverse and inclusive cast.

Cast

Main
 Ella Bright as Darrell Rivers
 Danya Griver as Gwendoline Mary Lacey
 Zoey Siewert as Alicia Johns (Seasons 1–2; 4-)
 Sienna Arif-Knights as Sally Hope
 Imogen Lamb as Mary-Lou Linnet
 Natasha Raphael as Irene Edwards (recurring season 1; main season 2–)
 Beth Bradfield as Jean Dunlop (recurring season 1; main season 2–)
 Ashley McGuire as Matron (Recurring season 1; main season 2–)
 Carys John as Ellen Wilson (Season 2–)
 Amelie Green as Wilhelmina 'Bill' Robinson (Season 3–)

Recurring
 Twinkle Jaiswal as Katherine (Season 1)
 Saskia Kemkers as Emily (Season 1)
 Hannah Saxby as Pamela (Season 1)
 Geneviève Beaudet as Mam’Zelle Rougier
 Imali Perera as Miss Potts (Season 1)
 Jennifer Wigmore (Season 1 & Christmas Special-) as Miss Elizabeth Grayling
 Christine Horne as Margaret (Season 1)
 Jude Harper - Wrobel as Ron
 Birgitte Solem (Seasons 2–3) as Miss Elizabeth Grayling
 Jason Callender as Mr. Parker (Season 2 & 4)
 Edie Whitehead as Georgina Thomas (Season 2)
 Christien Anholt as Mr. Lacey (Season 3)
 Emily Piggford as Miss Julia Johnson and Jennifer Johnson (Season 3)
 Bre Francis as Mavis (Season 3)

Episodes

Series 1

Series 2

Series 3

Christmas Specials

Production
In July 2019, it was announced in a press release that CBBC and Family Channel had commissioned a 13-part co-produced adaptation of Enid Blyton's ‘phenomenal’ Malory Towers. Sasha Hails and Rachel Flowerday would adapt the series for television with Rebecca Rycroft and Bruce McDonald directing. From DHX Media, Josh Scherba, Anne Loi and Michael Goldsmith are executive producing; Angela Boudreault is producing. From King Bert Productions, Jo Sargent is executive producing and Grainne McNamara is producing.

Principal photography began in Toronto, Canada in summer 2019 and later moved to in Cornwall and Devon in England, shooting at Hartland Abbey and in the town of Bodmin.

Release
CBBC released a teaser trailer on 20 March 2020 with the announcement that the series would premiere on 6 April 2020. The entire first series of episodes was available to view early on BBC iPlayer as of 23 March to viewers in the UK with a TV licence. The first two episodes aired on Family Channel in Canada that 1 July. The second season was also released in its entirety on the BBC iPlayer on 22 November 2021, with broadcasts expected on CBBC in 2022.

It was also announced that WildBrain would handle international distribution outside the United Kingdom.

Malory Towers began airing on BYUtv on Sundays in America on 13 September 2020.

References

External links

2020 British television series debuts
2020s British children's television series
2020s Canadian children's television series
BBC children's television shows
Adaptations of works by Enid Blyton
British television shows based on children's books
Canadian television shows based on children's books
English-language television shows
Television series about children
Television series set in the 1940s
Television series by DHX Media